The knockout stage of UEFA Euro 1980 was a single-elimination tournament involving the four teams that qualified from the group stage of the tournament. There were two matches: a third place play-off contested by the group runners-up, and the final to decide the champions, contested by the group winners. The knockout stage began with the third place play-off on 21 June and ended with the final on 22 June at the Stadio Olimpico in Rome. West Germany won the tournament with a 2–1 victory over Belgium.

All times Central European Summer Time (UTC+2)

Format
For the third place play-off, if the scores remained level after the end of the regular 90 minutes, the match would go stright to a penalty shoot-out (at least five penalties each, and more if necessary). If the final was undecided by the end of the regular 90 minutes, thirty minutes of extra time (two 15-minute halves) would be played. If scores were still level after 30 minutes of extra time, there would be a penalty shoot-out (at least five penalties each, and more if necessary) to determine the champion.

Qualified teams
The top two placed teams from each of the two groups qualified for the knockout stage.

Bracket

Third place play-off

Final

References

External links

 UEFA Euro 1980 official history

Knockout stage
1980
Knockout stage
Knockout stage
Knockout stage
Knockout stage